The Hunt with John Walsh is an American investigation/documentary series that debuted on CNN on July 13, 2014. The series is hosted by John Walsh. The second season premiered on July 12, 2015, and the third season premiered on June 19, 2016. The fourth season premiered on CNN's sister station, HLN, on July 23, 2017.  A successor to the show, In Pursuit with John Walsh was announced in early 2018. It premiered in January 2019 on Investigation Discovery.

Format 
The series profiles an unsolved and ongoing high-profile crime story as told by witnesses (including the surviving victims) and law enforcement officials, along with re-enactments of how the events happened. A picture of the person or persons involved is shown along with a number to call (1-866-THE-HUNT, or 1-866-843-4868)  if a viewer has any information or leads on the subject featured on the program. Tipsters' identities will remain anonymous, and may be eligible for a cash award if it leads to the apprehension & conviction of the fugitive(s) involved.

Aftermath
One of the suspects who was profiled on The Hunt episode that aired on July 20, 2014, Charles Mozdir, was shot and killed during a shootout with police and US Marshals in New York City on July 28, 2014. Mozdir had been wanted in connection with child molestation and pornography, including being convicted for molesting a child of a family friend in Coronado, California in 2012, when he fled after failing to show up for his sentencing. This would be followed five days later on August 3, 2014, when a hiker discovered the remains of Shane Miller, a convicted felon who was the subject of a manhunt after he murdered his wife and two daughters on May 7, 2013. Miller's body was found outside a creek near Petrolia, California, where he was last seen after evading authorities. Miller was the first person to be profiled on The Hunt (July 13, 2014) and its second to have met with a deadly conclusion.

Since the show's airing, twenty-three fugitives have been captured, one was killed, and three were found dead.

Reception
The series has received mixed reviews, mostly about the show's format. In a review from Variety writer Brian Lowry noted that the series was "Essentially a new iteration of Walsh's America's Most Wanted, the show feels more suited to TLC or Investigation Discovery, featuring reenacted shots like a dead body with blood artfully oozing from it. In the process, CNN further blurs the thin red line between news and Lifetime movie."

Audience reception, however, was and has been much more positive. The debut episode won the 9 PM ET time slot for cable news networks, delivering 989,000 total viewers and 330,000 in the 25–54 demographic range. It was the highest-rated debut episode in the demo for a CNN original series.

The Hunt continued to win its time slot in total viewers and the 25–54 demographic for the rest of the month of July.

Episodes

Season 1 (2014)

Season 2 (2015)

Season 3 (2016)

Season 4 (2017)

References

External links 
Official website

2014 American television series debuts
2017 American television series endings
2010s American reality television series
2010s American documentary television series
2010s American television news shows
2010s American crime television series
CNN original programming
English-language television shows
Law enforcement in the United States
Television series featuring reenactments
True crime television series